Over the Counter Culture is the debut studio album by English indie rock band the Ordinary Boys. The album received critical praise and spawned the singles "Maybe Someday", "Week In Week Out", "Talk Talk Talk", and "Seaside". On its initial release in the UK, there was an ordinary version and Special Edition of the album issued. The Special Edition of the album included a second disc, a bonus limited edition live EP of the band recorded live at the Carling Academy in Birmingham on June 4, 2004. The tracks on the live EP, mixed by Stephen Street, are "The List Goes On", "(Little) Bubble", "Talk Talk Talk" and "Maybe Someday". The title track "Over the Counter Culture" was featured on the Burnout 3: Takedown soundtrack.

Track listing
"Over the Counter Culture"
"The List Goes On"
"Week In Week Out"
"Talk Talk Talk"
"Little Bitch" (Jerry Dammers) - A cover of The Specials
"Settle Down"
"Weekend Revolution"
"Maybe Someday"
"Just a Song"
"Seaside"
"In Awe of the Awful"
"Robots and Monkeys"
Bonus Live Disc
"The List Goes On" [Live]
"(Little) Bubble" [Live]
"Talk Talk Talk" [Live]
"Maybe Someday" [Live]

References

The Ordinary Boys albums
2004 debut albums
B-Unique Records albums
Albums produced by Stephen Street